Weavers is an unincorporated community in Darke County, in the U.S. state of Ohio.

History
A former variant name of Weavers was Weavers Station. The community was named for Peter Weaver, the original owner of the town site. A post office called Weavers Station was established in 1868, and remained in operation until 1914. Besides the post office, Weavers Station contained a railroad station, grain elevator, and country store.

References

Unincorporated communities in Darke County, Ohio
Unincorporated communities in Ohio